Emanuel Alexis Moriatis (born January 19, 1980 in Lanús, Buenos Aires province) is an Argentine (of Greek origin) racing driver. He won the Turismo Carretera championship in 2009, and the Turismo Nacional Clase 3 championship in 2012 and 2016.

He started his motorsport career in quad racing. In 1998 he made his debut in car racing and the following year he made his debut in the Turismo Nacional championship (Clase 2). In 2002 he made his debut in Turismo Carretera, in 2005 in Top Race V6 and in 2009 in TC 2000, winning the private drivers' championship that year. Also in 2009 he won the TC title, against Mariano Altuna and José María López.

In the 2010 TC 2000 season, Moriatis race with Fiat Argentina factory team.

In the Clase 3 of Turismo Nacional, he achieved two championships (2012 and 2016) until he left the serie in 2019.

External links
 Official Twitter

1980 births
Argentine people of Greek descent
Argentine racing drivers
Turismo Carretera drivers
TC 2000 Championship drivers
Top Race V6 drivers
Sportspeople from Lanús
Living people
Súper TC 2000 drivers